The 2019–20 season will be Ferencvárosi TC's 62nd competitive and consecutive season in the Nemzeti Bajnokság I and 70th year in existence as a handball club.

Players

Squad information

Goalkeepers
 16  Blanka Bíró
 31  Zsófi Szemerey
Left Wingers 
 6  Nadine Schatzl
 21  Gréta Márton
 27  Luca Háfra
Right Wingers
 22  Viktória Lukács
 28  Kíra Bánfai
Line players
 2  Noémi Pásztor
 11  Lívia Nagy
 24  Danick Snelder 

Left Backs
 10  Klára Csiszár-Szekeres
 15  Kinga Debreczeni-Klivinyi
 45  Noémi Háfra
 92  Dóra Hornyák
Centre Backs
 8  Zita Szucsánszki
 17  Emilie Christensen 
 33  Nikolett Tóth
 91  Anikó Kovacsics (c)
Right Backs
 42  Katrin Klujber

Transfers
Source:  hetmeteres.hu

 In:
 Kíra Bánfai (loan from MTK Budapest)
 Emilie Christensen (from  Larvik)
 Dóra Hornyák (returned after pregnancy)
 Katrin Klujber (from Dunaújváros)
 Noémi Pásztor (from Budaörs)
 Zita Szucsánszki (returned after pregnancy)

 Out:
 Dorottya Faluvégi (to Győri ETO)
 Kata Farkas (to Békéscsaba)
 Gréta Hadfi (loan to Vác)
 Dóra Horváth (to Kisvárda)
 Bobana Klikovac (to  SCM Craiova)
 Djurdjina Malović (loan to MTK Budapest)
 Nerea Pena (to Siófok)
 Sára Suba  (loan to MTK Budapest)
 Melinda Szikora (to Siófok)
 Rea Mészáros (loan to Vác as of December 2019)

Club

Technical Staff

Source: Coaches, Staff

Uniform
Supplier: Nike
Main sponsor: Rail Cargo Hungaria / tippmix / Lidl / City of Budapest 
Back sponsor: Budapest Spas / My drone space / NKM
Shorts sponsor: FCsM / Neckermann

Competitions

Overview

Nemzeti Bajnokság I

Results by round

Matches

Results overview

EHF Champions League

Group stage

Matches

Results overview

Main round

Matches

Results overview

Statistics

Top scorers
Includes all competitive matches. The list is sorted by shirt number when total goals are equal.
Last updated on 29 February 2020

Attendances

List of the home matches:

References

Notes

External links
 
 FTC-Rail Cargo Hungaria at eurohandball.com

 
Ferencvárosi TC